The  is a mixed-use building in the Chuo special ward of Tokyo, Japan. Completed in August 2010, it stands at 192.2 (631 ft) tall.

See also 
 List of tallest structures in Tokyo

References

Buildings and structures completed in 2010
Residential skyscrapers in Tokyo